Poynting is an impact crater on Mars.  It lies north of Pavonis Mons and west of Ascraeus Mons.

It was named by the IAU in 1988 after English astrophysicist John Henry Poynting.

Poynting is the largest impact crater in the Tharsis quadrangle.

References 

Impact craters on Mars